Troitske is a village in Kramatorsk Raion (district) in Donetsk Oblast of eastern Ukraine, at about 50 km NW from the centre of Donetsk city.

External links
 Weather forecast for Troitske

Villages in Kramatorsk Raion